Heather Richards (born 16 February 1994) is a Scottish football forward who plays for Hamilton Academical of the Scottish Women's Premier League (SWPL).

Club career
Coming from Rangers, Richards transferred to Celtic in December 2011, where she stayed three years. In December 2014 she transferred from Celtic to Hibernian, returning to Celtic during the 2016 mid-season break. Resuming her football career after a long break, she was one of five new signings for Hamilton Academical in January 2020.

International career
Richards made her 'A' international debut for Scotland on 12 March 2014 against Korea Republic, replacing Lisa Evans in the 89th minute. She also represented Scotland at under-17 and under-19 level.

References

External links 
 Heather Richards at UEFA.com
 

1994 births
Living people
Scottish women's footballers
Scotland women's international footballers
Rangers W.F.C. players
Celtic F.C. Women players
Hibernian W.F.C. players
Women's association football forwards
Hamilton Academical W.F.C. players